John Malcolm is a former New Zealand international lawn bowler.

He won a bronze medal in the triples and a bronze medal in the fours at the 1980 World Outdoor Bowls Championship in Melbourne.

In addition he won a silver medal in the fours at the 1978 Commonwealth Games in Edmonton.

References

Living people
New Zealand male bowls players
Commonwealth Games medallists in lawn bowls
Commonwealth Games silver medallists for New Zealand
Year of birth missing (living people)
Bowls players at the 1978 Commonwealth Games
20th-century New Zealand people
Medallists at the 1978 Commonwealth Games